Ecce Homo is a painting by a follower of the Netherlandish painter Hieronymus Bosch. It depicts the presentation of Jesus Christ by Pontius Pilate to the throngs of Jerusalem. This painting is at the Indianapolis Museum of Art in Indianapolis, Indiana; it is closely similar to one at the Philadelphia Museum of Art.

They are not to be confused with the 1470s Bosch painting of the same name.

References

Sources
 Gibson, Walter S (1973). Hieronymus Bosch. New York: Thames and Hudson. 

1510s paintings
Paintings by Hieronymus Bosch
Bosch
Paintings in Indianapolis
Paintings in the collection of the Philadelphia Museum of Art
Cultural depictions of Pontius Pilate